The Mangaroa River is a river of the Wellington Region of New Zealand's North Island. It flows north from the western foothills of the Remutaka Range to the west of Lower Hutt, meeting with the Hutt River on the northern outskirts of Upper Hutt.

See also
List of rivers of New Zealand

References

Rivers of the Wellington Region
Rivers of New Zealand